Šagarakti-Šuriaš, written phonetically ša-ga-ra-ak-ti-šur-ia-aš or dša-garak-ti-šu-ri-ia-aš in cuneiform or in a variety of other forms, Šuriaš (a Kassite sun god corresponding to Babylonian Šamaš) gives me life, (1245–1233 BC short chronology) was the twenty seventh king of the Third or Kassite dynasty of Babylon. The earliest extant economic text is dated to the 5th day of Nisan in his accession year, corresponding to his predecessor’s year 9, suggesting the succession occurred very early in the year as this month was the first in the Babylonian calendar. He ruled for thirteen years and was succeeded by his son, Kaštiliašu IV.

Biography

The Babylonian King List A names Kudur-Enlil as his father but there are no confirmatory contemporary inscriptions and the reigns are too short around this period to allow for the genealogy alleged by this king list. He is featured in a letter written in later times between the Assyrian king Tukulti-Ninurta I and the Hittite king, possibly Suppiluliuma II. Unfortunately the text is not well preserved, but the phrase “non-son of Kudur-Enlil” is apparently used to describe him, in a passage discussing the genealogy of the Kassite monarchy.

Economic turbulence

More than three hundred economic texts have been found in several caches from Ur, Dur-Kurigalzu, and overwhelmingly Nippur dated to Šagarakti-Šuriaš’ reign. In addition, there are 127 tablets recently published probably recovered from Dūr-Enlilē. They are characterized by the extraordinary variety of spellings used to name this king, who bears a defiantly Kassite title in contrast with his predecessor. Brinkman identifies eighty four permutations, but disputes the suggestion by others that Ātanaḫ-Šamaš was a Babylonianized equivalent adopted to overcome the linguistic problems of the natives. The texts record events such as the hire of slaves, payments in butter to temple servants, and even an agreement to assume a debt for which a priest had been imprisoned. Amīl-Marduk was the Šandabakku or governor of Nippur during his reign, a position he had filled since the earlier reign of Kudur-Enlil. Four tablets obtained on the antiquities market but believed to be from Nippur concern the release of prisoners after a guarantee. They date to the ascession year, year 1, and year 2 of Šagarakti-Šuriaš.

It has been suggested that the preponderance of commercial texts detailing debts, loans and slave transactions indicate that Babylonia faced hard economic times during his reign, where people sold themselves into slavery to repay their creditors. One of which seems to indicate his involvement in the incarceration of an individual while another is a declaration of zakût nippurēti, "freeing of the women of Nippur" as part of a general amnesty. Ini-Tešub, the king of Kargamiš, wrote a letter to him complaining about the activities of the Ahlamu and their effect on communications and presumably trade.

The Sippar-Annunītu Eulmaš of Ištar-Annunītu

Šagarakti-Šuriaš built the shrine, or Eulmaš, of the warrior goddess Ištar-Annunītu, in the city of Sippar-Annunītu. Nabonidus (556-539 BC), the last king of the Neo-Babylonian Empire, recorded on one of his four foundation cylinders, pictured, that

They were actually separated by slightly less than six hundred and eighty years. This is the only other inscription describing Šagarakti-Šuriaš as son of Kudur-Enlil. Another of his cylinders quotes his statue inscription, buried in a trench at the site of the temple:

The Seal legend

A clay tablet from the time of Sennacherib (705–681 BC) quotes a legendary inscription from a lapis lazuli seal. Originally the seal was in the possession of Shagarakti-Shuriash, but was carried off to Nineveh by Tukulti-Ninurta I (1243–1207 BC) as war booty when he sacked Babylon during Kaštiliašu’s reign, and he had his own inscription engraved on it without erasing the original. Sometime afterwards the seal again found its way back to Babylon, in circumstances unknown, where it was re-plundered, some six hundred years later by Sennacherib.

A brick discovered in situ in Nippur has an inscription along its edge which shows that Šagarakti-Šuriaš commissioned work here on the Ekur of Enlil as well.

Inscriptions

References

13th-century BC Babylonian kings
Kassite kings